Anaeromyces is a genus of fungi in the family Neocallimastigaceae.

References

Neocallimastigomycota
Fungus genera